Jamie Thomas (born May 22, 1992) is an American professional soccer player who plays for the Baltimore Blast of the Major Arena Soccer League.

Career

Youth and college
Thomas began playing club soccer at the age of 8 for the MSC United (Montgomery Soccer Club) in Rockville, Maryland, under Coach Julio Arjona, Sr. from 2000 to 2006.  While playing on the MSC United 92 team, Thomas helped the team win the 2002 U-10 National Futsal Championship in Las Vegas, Nevada  and the 2003 U-12 National Futsal Championship in Long Beach, California, as well as winning the following tournaments: NCSL Division 1 four times; CASL Shootout, Raleigh, NC; Bethesda, MD; Potomac, MD; Del Sol, Arizona; DELCO, PA; Kirkwood, DE; and YMS, PA.  Thomas was also named to the Maryland ODP Region I roster.

In 2006, Thomas began playing club soccer for the Pachuca Internationals in Maryland, under Coach Pete Mehlert, where Thomas helped them win the U-17 Maryland State Cup Championship in 2009  and the 2009 Surf Cup U-19 Super Group Championship.

Thomas played  college soccer for St. John's University from 2010 to 2013. While with the Red Storm he was a four-year starter and made 80 appearances scoring 1 goal.  Thomas helped the team win the 2011 Big East Conference Men's Soccer Tournament and earned second team All-BIG EAST honors.  Thomas was named to the All-Tournament Team for his defensive efforts and helped his team win the Gamecock Classic.

Professional

New York Red Bulls II
Thomas  signed with New York Red Bulls II for the 2015 season and made his debut as a starter for the side in its first ever match on March 28, 2015 in a 0-0 draw with Rochester Rhinos. On August 2, 2015, Thomas recorded his first assist for New York on a counterattack feed to Marius Obekop helping New York to a 2-1 victory against Saint Louis FC. Thomas was named to the USL Team of the Week for his performance on August 29, 2015 in a 2-0 victory over Wilmington Hammerheads FC. Thomas helped New York to a second straight shutout victory and assisted Manolo Sanchez on the game-winning goal during the match.

Harrisburg City Islanders
In March 2016, it was announced that Thomas has signed with Harrisburg City Islanders. Thomas would become a regular starter for the City Islanders, making 27 league appearances and 3 U.S. Open Cup appearances in his first season.

Baltimore Blast
In November 2016, it was announced that Thomas would spend the USL offseason with the MASL club Baltimore Blast on loan from Harrisburg.

References

External links 
 redstormsports.com player profile

1992 births
Living people
American soccer players
St. John's Red Storm men's soccer players
New York Red Bulls II players
Penn FC players
Association football defenders
Soccer players from Maryland
USL Championship players
Major Arena Soccer League players
Baltimore Blast players